Callum Tarren (born 2 October 1990) is an English professional golfer who currently plays on the PGA Tour.

Amateur career
Tarren attended Radford University from 2011 to 2014.

Professional career
Tarren turned professional in 2015 and began to play on the PGA Tour China. He won the PGA Tour China Order of Merit in 2018.

Tarren played on the Korn Ferry Tour during 2020–21, gaining status to play on the PGA Tour in the 2021–22 season.

In November 2022, Tarren recorded his best finish to date on the PGA Tour. He finished tied-second at the RSM Classic, finishing two shots behind Adam Svensson.

Professional wins (1)

China Tour wins (1)

Results in major championships
Results not in chronological order in 2020.

CUT = missed the half-way cut
"T" indicates a tie for a place
NT = No tournament due to COVID-19 pandemic

Results in The Players Championship

CUT = missed the halfway cut

See also
2021 Korn Ferry Tour Finals graduates

References

External links

English male golfers
PGA Tour golfers
1990 births
Living people